Jaane Jigar is a 1998 Indian Bollywood action film directed by Arshad Khan and produced by B.R. Sahni. The film stars Jackie Shroff and Mamta Kulkarni.

Plot 
This is the story of Meena and Meenu comes from different family but they look exactly the same. Meena loves Ravi and Meenu fall in love with Vijay.

Cast
 Jackie Shroff as Jaikishan
 Mamta Kulkarni as Meenu and Meena
 Ayub Khan as Ravi Kumar
 Manek Bedi as Vijay
 Mohnish Bahl as Monty
 Kader Khan as Ghanshyam
 Rita Bhaduri as Mrs. Prem Kishan
 Tiku Talsania as Ghanshyam's friend
 Yunus Parvez as Seth Babu Singh
 Vikas Anand as Prem Kishan
 Kunika as Lady in the Beach
 Puneet Issar as Rana

Soundtrack

References

External links

1998 films
1990s Hindi-language films
Films scored by Rajesh Roshan
Indian action films